Zviahel (translit. Zvil) is a city in the Zhytomyr Oblast (province) of northern Ukraine. Originally known as Zviahel, the city was renamed to Novohrad-Volynskyi in 1795 after annexation of territories of Polish–Lithuanian Commonwealth by the Russian Empire soon after the third Partition of Poland. On 16 June 2022 city council renamed the city again to Zviahel. The decision on renaming the city was approved by the Ukrainian parliament on 16 November 2022.

The city serves as the administrative center of Zviahel Raion (district). Population: 

The city is located on the main route to Kyiv near its crossing at the Sluch River. Located on Sluch, the city geographically is located on the eastern border of historical Volhynia (Volyn) or Volhynia Superior.

Name
The city has previously been known as: Возвягель Vozviahel, Звяголь Zviahol, Zviahel, Звягаль Zviahal, Dzwihel, Novohrad-Volynskyi.

Originally known as Zviahel, the city was renamed to Novohrad-Volynskyi in 1795 after annexation of territories of Polish–Lithuanian Commonwealth by the Russian Empire soon after the third Partition of Poland.

Since the 1991 Act of Declaration of Independence of Ukraine there have been several attempts to rename the city. Public discussions on renaming the city to Zviahel began in April 2022. On 16 June 2022 city council renamed the city again to Zviahel. The decision was supported by 22 of the 30 deputies present, while four deputies opposed and abstained. The name change was then to be approved by the deputies of the Zhytomyr Oblast Council. And the final decision on renaming the city had then to be made by the Ukrainian parliament. The decision on renaming the city was approved by the Ukrainian parliament on 16 November 2022.

On 31 March 2022 the city council had removed the letter Z (which was a reference to the name Zviahel and it was placed on the bell symbol) from its coats of arms. This was done because letter Z was widely used by the invading Russian army during the 2022 Russian invasion of Ukraine and has become a propaganda tool in Russia.

History
The city was mentioned in the Galician-Volhynian Chronicle under the year of 1256 as the town of Zviahel. The original settlement was an Old Ruthenian town of Bolokhiv Land located on the right bank of Sluch. In 1257 it was razed by Daniel of Galicia.

The next mentioning of the settlement is found in 1432 as a rebuilt one on the left bank upstream from the original site. Since 14th century it belonged to the Grand Duchy of Lithuania owned by Zwiahelski princely family. In 1501 to 1554 the town belonged to Ostrogski princely family. In 1507 Konstanty Ostrogski built here a castle. After formation of Volhynian Voivodeship, it was located in Lutsk County. Following the 1569 Union of Lublin it was passed on to the Crown of Poland.

During the Khmelnytsky Uprising, Cossacks destroyed portion of the city's fortification and burnt down the Catholic church (kosciol). In September 1648 in the city was formed an insurgency group of local peasants led by Mykhalo Tysha. In 1650s in Zwiahel existed Zwiahel Regiment.

In 18th century the city belonged to Lubomirski princely family.

The city had an important Jewish community. In the late 19th century it was home to 9,378 Jews, more than half the population of the town. Pogroms killed approximately 1,000 Jews in 1919. After the Treaty of Riga, Novohrad-Volynskyi became part of the Ukrainian Soviet Socialist Republic of the Soviet Union. By the start of World War II only 6,840 Jews remained, (30% of the total population). Hundreds of Jews were murdered in mass executions perpetrated by an Einsatzgruppen in 1941. Many survivors were imprisoned in harsh conditions in a ghetto and murdered in November 1942, and an important part of the town was destroyed during the war.

Climate

Notable people
Lesya Ukrainka (1871–1913), poet and writer
Valerii Zaluzhnyi (1973), general and Commander-in-Chief of the Armed Forces of Ukraine
Peter Krasnow (1886–1979), artist
Elena Yakovleva (born 1961), actress
 Baruch Korff (1914-1995), Jewish activist known as "Nixon's rabbi"
Oleksandr Kovalchuk (1974), politician

Twin towns – sister cities

Zviahel is twinned with:

 Bełchatów, Poland
 Dolyna, Ukraine
 Halych, Ukraine
 Khashuri, Georgia
 Łomża, Poland
 Myrhorod, Ukraine
 Rahachow, Belarus
 Suomussalmi, Finland

Gallery

References

External links
 Official Web Site   (expired)
 Novohrad-Volynskyi. Encyclopedia of Ukraine
 Find out Novograd-Volynskyi @ Ukrainian.Travel

 
Cities in Zhytomyr Oblast
Novograd-Volynsky Uyezd
Volhynian Voivodeship (1569–1795)
Cossack Hetmanate
Shtetls
Cities of regional significance in Ukraine
City name changes in Ukraine
Holocaust locations in Ukraine
Ostrogski family
Mass murder in 1919